Big Brother Brasil (commonly abbreviated to BBB) is the Brazilian version of the Big Brother reality franchised television show based on the original Dutch television series of the same name, that was created in 1997 by John de Mol. It is the second one with more finished seasons (only after the American version) and the only one with more than 20 years of uninterrupted annual transmission in the same channel.

The show is based on a group of strangers, known as housemates, living together twenty-four hours a day in the "Big Brother" house, isolated from the outside world (primarily from mass media, such as newspapers, telephones, television and the internet) while having all their steps followed by cameras around-the-clock, with no privacy for three months.

The housemates compete for the chance to win the grand prize by avoiding weekly eviction, until the last housemate remains at the end of the season that can claim the grand prize. The show's current host is journalist Tadeu Schmidt.

TV Globo's website and a Globo-owned pay-per-view channel offer round-the-clock coverage. Sabrina Sato (season 3) used to be one of the hosts of Panico na TV and now hosts her own TV program, Juliana Alves (season 3) and Grazi Massafera (season 5) are soap opera actresses at TV Globo,  Íris Stefanelli and Flávia Vianna (season 7) was a reporter for many years in a TV show called TV Fama. The four can be considered the most successful contestants of the show, although none of them have won the show. The only three winners of hit shows are Jean Wyllys, who had been following a very successful political career as a federal deputy since winning the fifth season until leaving Brazil in 2019. Thelma Assis , who became a TV presenter for the station, in addition to having contracts with several brands. And Juliette Freire who became an internet phenomenon by reaching 24 million Instagram followers during the show's 21st season. After the show, she devoted herself to building a successful music career.

The twentieth season of the show had the biggest participation in the world of votings in an eviction, reaching over 1.5 billion votes. The previous record, also achieved by Big Brother Brasil in the same season, was 416 million votes. Advertising quotas reached R$ 78 million, with a total collection of R$ 530 million.

The House
The Big Brother Brasil house is located inside Estúdios Globo, the Globo's production center in Rio de Janeiro. The house is considered by most Big Brother specialists as the biggest and most extravagant house of all Big Brothers.

The external area of the house is approximately 700 square meters (m2) while the internal areas is about 200 m2. The house has three bedrooms (two for the regular contestants and one for week's Head of Household), a living room, two bathrooms (one inside a bedroom), a big garden, two kitchens (one for the Haves and another for the Have-nots), a gym, a Jacuzzi, a pool, a laundry room, a Diary Room and a separate area, called "another dimension", which was once the white bedroom (ninth and tenth seasons) and the surprise bedroom (eleventh season).

Show format

Launch night
On the night of the Live Launch several members of the public, who have passed through several audition processes, enter the House to become Housemates of the Big Brother House. Once inside the house the Housemates will live together and have no contact with the outside world.

Head of Household (Líder)
Except in the first week, after each eviction  (Portuguese: paredão, a term which literally means "big wall"), housemates compete to become the "Head of Household" (líder), by winning a weekly physical endurance challenge, based on a specific skill, a general knowledge quiz or, even sometimes through a luck event.

The Líder receives perks such as their own private bedroom, photos or gifts from home, and maid service. The Líder is awarded immunity from the week's nomination (except in the fifteenth and sixteenth seasons where instead the Líder won a cash prize) and also has the power to directly nominate one housemate for eviction, in addition, the Líder is the tiebreaker for the house's nomination vote. Although one housemate normally retains the Leader rewards and responsibilities for the week, exceptions have occurred.

In a "double eviction" week, the first Líder only reigns for a short period (between an hour and three days) while the second Líder reigns for the rest of the week. When this occurs, the first Líder is normally not provided the perks awarded in a normal eviction week. Another exception is when two housemates share the Líder position, such as in the third week of the sixth season and in the first week of the seventh season.

Power of Immunity
In the third season, a weekly "Power of Immunity" (anjo, a term which literally means "angel") is introduced and determined. This housemate may choose any other housemate to protect from facing the eviction. However, in the seventh season, another selected house mate was given the "Power of Veto" to nullify the saving power.

Since the eighth season, Power of Immunity winner was also given a bad side (called monstro, a term which literally means "monster"), where that housemate, besides protecting someone from elimination, must "punish" one or more contestants, obliging them to do an unpleasing task or forbidding them to go to the party.

Estaleca or food competition
On Sundays, a competition allow the housemates to win food (until the fourth season) or estalecas (from the fifth season onwards) for the week. Most competitions are games of skill, although the housemates may work individually, in teams, or as one group.

Introduced in the fifth season, the "Estaleca" (Z$) is the official currency of the house. Each contestant has their own credit card with a set amount of Estalecas. Contestants may use their currency to purchase food for the house.

The winners of the week's Estaleca competition earn the right to do all the shopping, choosing what the entire house will eat for the upcoming week. As in the real stock market, the Estalecas can suffer some speculative attacks and thus the value of the groceries may inflate or deflate.

Sunday live nominations
First the PoI winner and HoH nominate their choices for their respective abilities. Then, each one of the remaining contestants go into the Diary Room, and vote on the contestant they wish to face an elimination match. The highest voted contestant is sent to the elimination match to face the person nominated by the HoH and an audience poll starts (either by telephone, SMS or Internet) to pick which of the nominated contestants shall be eliminated.

Tuesday live eviction
On Eviction Night, the poll result is shown and the highest voted housemate is eliminated and evicted from the house. The evicted housemate must to get ready to leave immediately. Once they leave the House they are greeted by the live crowd and the show host.

Live Final and the winner
In the Live Final, only two to three housemates remain in the house, after surviving numerous evictions. The public are then asked to vote for their favourite surviving Housemate to win the prize. The winner is announced and the final three surviving housemates leaving the house together, treated to a cheering crowd.

Season details

Reception

Brazilian ratings
All numbers are provided by IBOPE.

 Each point represents 60,000 households in São Paulo.

Records

Highest number of rejections

Celebrities
Usually Big Brother contestants are already forgotten by the time of the next season, but there are a few exceptions of contestants who became national stars. Juliana Alves, Sabrina Sato, Grazi Massafera, Íris Stefanelli and Juliette Freire are probably the biggest celebrities coming out of the reality show.

Sabrina Sato became a personality on the country after appearing in the third season. She posed naked twice for Playboy magazine and is one of the hosts of Pânico na TV, a very popular TV show among teenagers and Rede TV!'s most-watched show. She now has one of Record Network's biggest contracts and is also the spokesperson for several companies.

After her participation in the fifth season, where she was billed as extremely charismatic and nice, Grazielli Massafera also became a huge celebrity appearing in over 130 magazine covers, posing naked for Playboy magazine, starring in over 13 commercials and winning an important role on TV Globo's 9 o'clock soap opera Páginas da Vida, where she received bad critics. Grazi is now a public and critical acclaim actress, becoming one of the most popular celebrities in the country and was married Cauã Raymond, one of Brazil's most popular and eligible young actors. In 2016, she was nominated for the International Emmy Award for Best Actress.

Íris Stefanelli attracted huge attention during her time in the house and achieved extreme popularity, thanks to her charisma. She became a personality in the country after appearing in the seventh season, She received a big paycheck to pose naked for Playboy. Globo decided not to take into consideration "Siri" (as she was nicknamed in the house) huge popularity and decided not to give her a long-term contract. She was contracted by small RedeTV! to co-host celebrities show TV Fama. Her lucrative deal was highlighted by the media. Íris is still a host on the show after the huge buzz that ensued her participation on the house.

Another contestant, male, Jean Wyllys started his career in politics after participating in the program and was elected federal deputy in 2010, 2014 and 2018.
Thelma Assis became a tv presenter and model, Juliette Freire became a singer, scoring her first EP on pre-saves on Spotify on Brazil .

Game

My Big Brother
A mobile version of Big Brother was released in 2005, called My Big Brother, and reproduced the entire show, in real-time, inside mobile phones. Big Brother Brasil is also on software and is manufactured by Continuum Entertainment and Brasoft Studios.

Big Game BBB
Big Game BBB appeared in the 22nd season of Big Brother Brasil and brought some news, but, in addition to the program itself, this edition also marked the launch of Big Game BBB, a free virtual game by Globo in which reality fans can guess about the dynamics of the week and see who does better in the bets.

Controversy and criticism 
Big Brother Brasil 3 began on January 14, 2003, and was controversial. One of the contestants was the current Miss Brazil, Joseane Oliveira. Rules of the Miss Brazil contest forbid participation of married women but Joseane stated she was single. As a consequence of the exposure during the reality show, some magazines discovered she was married even before winning the beauty contest.

Once the marriage was proven, Joseane was stripped of her crown, and Thaisa Tomsem was crowned Miss Brazil 2002. Also, contestant Dilson Walkarez was not aware of Joseane relationship's status and tried to start a romantic relationship with her during the show. Due to her refusals, he felt unmotivated and left the show voluntarily. Housemate Harry Grossman replaced him at February 26 and became the first housemate not to enter the show on its first day.

During Big Brother Brasil 8, the contestant Juliana Goes fainted during an endurance task where the contestants had to remain perfectly still inside a glass chamber. Newspapers and websites accused the show of being inhumane. However, the show was unaffected by the negative press.

In Big Brother Brasil 10, Marcelo Dourado, a returning contestant from BBB4, was accused of being homophobic but that was ignored and he eventually won his second season.

But the biggest scandal of the show happened on Big Brother Brasil 12 when contestant Daniel Echaniz was accused of raping one of the contestants, Monique Amin. He was expelled during the first week and denied the accusations, which were eventually dropped.

In Big Brother Brasil 19, only a few days after the beginning of the show, contestant Vanderson Brito faced rape accusations published online by his former girlfriend. He was expelled after police subpoenaed him for an interview, violating the house rule of having no contact with the outside world. Contestant Hariany Almeida was also expelled, after a party night where she was drunk lead to her pushing another contestant, violating the house rule of no violence. The show also faced considerable criticism as the house divided into two groups, separated by class and race, which lead to considerable racist comments and even police investigations regarding religious intolerance.

In Big Brother Brasil 21, the contestant Karol Conká behavior and actions towards other housemates garnered a very negative reception from the viewers and public personalities. This included Karol's encouragement of outcasting certain housemates, aggressive comments that sparked discussions regarding psychological abuse and prejudiced comments that ranged from gaslighting, xenophobia, religious intolerance and sexual harassment, resulting in her cancellation with loss of followers on social networks and being evicted with the highest rejection of all the seasons, with 99.17% of the votes.

References

External links
Official
 Big Brother Brasil
 Big Brother Brasil 14
 Big Brother Brasil 13
 Big Brother Brasil 12
 Big Brother Brasil 11
 Big Brother Brasil 10
 Big Brother Brasil 9
 Big Brother Brasil 8
 Big Brother Brasil 7
 Big Brother Brasil 6
 Big Brother Brasil 5
 Big Brother Brasil 4
 Big Brother Brasil 3
 Big Brother Brasil 2
 Big Brother Brasil 1
 
 Bet on Big Brother Brasil

 
Rede Globo original programming
2002 Brazilian television series debuts
Brazilian reality television series
Portuguese-language television shows
Brazilian television series based on Dutch television series
Television shows filmed in Brazil